Melanochromis baliodigma is a species of cichlid endemic to Lake Malawi where it is only known from the area around Membe Point in areas where sandy bottoms meet up with rocky areas. This species can grow to a length of  SL.

References

baliodigma
Fish of Lake Malawi
Fish of Malawi
Fish described in 1997
Taxa named by Nancy Jean Bowers
Taxa named by Jay Richard Stauffer Jr.
Taxonomy articles created by Polbot